State Plane Factory (Bulgarian:Държавна самолетна фабрика) was established in 1938 and operated until 1954 in Lovech.

History 
The buildings of the factory were constructed from Polish engineers. In the first years in the factory worked around 50 years. Chief engineer is Dimitar Atanasov, chief of the engineering department – engineer Konstantin Boshnakov, constructors – Boris Bonchev, Anton Daskalov, Peter Hristanov, Dimitar Manolov, Vladimir Vlahov.

Products

See also 
 Darzhavna Aeroplanna Rabotilnitsa

References

Footnotes

Notes

Bibliography 

 

Aircraft manufacturers of Bulgaria
Lovech